Richard O'Neill (born 1943) is an Anglo-Irish author and editor. Formerly a regular soldier, itinerant labourer and professional boxer, he now specializes in military history and has contributed to many books on weaponry and military history, as well as writing on Victorian painting. He has a son and a daughter from a former marriage. He is now semi-retired and lives alone in coastal Suffolk.

Bibliography
 The Complete Encyclopedia of 20th Century Warships
 The Vietnam War
 An Illustrated History of the Royal Navy
 Presidents of the United States
 The Middle Ages
 World War II 
 Suicide Squads - the men and machines of World War II Special Operations, Salamander Books, London, 1999 
 Natural Disasters
 Paintings of Victorian Childhood
 The Life and Work of Dante Gabriel Rossetti
 Patrick O'Brian's Navy
 Men and Monsters
 Strange World

References

1943 births
Living people
British military writers
Culver Academies alumni